Willard-Hay is a neighborhood within the larger Near North community in the northwest side of the U.S. city of Minneapolis which is known locally as the "Northside". The boundaries are roughly Olson Memorial Highway on the south, Penn Avenue on the east, (though a small portion of the neighborhood is northeast of Penn and Plymouth) Broadway Avenue on the northeast and Theodore Wirth Park on the west. The neighborhood is often known as Willard-Homewood by residents; the portion south of Plymouth is Homewood. The neighborhood is named after two elementary schools within its boundaries, Frances Willard and John Hay.

Demographics

References

External links
Minneapolis Neighborhood Profile - Willard-Hay

Neighborhoods in Minneapolis